Food Battle may refer to:

Food Battle Club, a Japanese competitive eating competition
Food Battle, a YouTube series by Smosh

See also
Food fight
Food riot
Food Wars (disambiguation)